Nick Restaino is an American baseball coach. He served as the head coach of the Fordham Rams (2005–2011) and the Sacred Heart Pioneers (2018–2022).

Coaching career
After graduating from Fordham University in 1993, Restaino became an assistant coach at Lehman College. The next year, Restaino accepted a position as an assistant for the Manhattan Jaspers baseball program. After spending two seasons with the Jaspers, Restaino joined the Fordham Rams baseball staff as an assistant.

On August 5, 2004, Restaino was named the interim head coach at Fordham. Restaino lead the Rams to a 34–21 record, winning the Atlantic 10 Conference Coach of the Year. Following the conclusion of the 2005 season, Fordham removed the interim tag from Restaino's title. After the 2011 season, Restaino decided to leave Fordham to pursue other opportunities.

Restaino joined the Southern Connecticut State University coaching staff in 2014. In 2015, Restaino joined the coaching staff of Sacred Heart. When Nick Giaquinto announced his retirement at the conclusion of the 2016 season, Sacred Heart announced that Restaino would be the next head coach for the Pioneers. On June 17, 2022, Restaino resigned as the head coach of the Pioneers.

Head coaching record

References

External links
Sacred Heart Pioneers bio

Living people
Fordham University alumni
Lehman Lightning baseball coaches
Manhattan Jaspers baseball coaches
Fordham Rams baseball coaches
Southern Connecticut State Fighting Owls baseball coaches
Sacred Heart Pioneers baseball coaches
Year of birth missing (living people)